Heino Pars (13 October 1925 Mustla, Viljandi County – 8 October 2014 Tallinn) is an Estonian animated film director. With Elbert Tuganov, he is the founder of Estonian puppetry animation.

In 2001 he was awarded with Order of the White Star, V class.

Filmography

 1962 "Väike motoroller"
 1964 "Operaator Kõps seeneriigis"
 1972 "Nael I"

References

1925 births
2014 deaths
Estonian animated film directors
University of Tartu alumni
Recipients of the Order of the White Star, 5th Class
People from Viljandi Parish